Lewis Charles Wendell (March 22, 1892 – July 11, 1953) was an American baseball player and team manager. Wendell was born March 22, 1892, in New York City. He played as a catcher in Major League Baseball, with his first game in 1915.

Wendell spent the next several seasons moving from team to team in the minors In 1921, he was the first of two managers for the Greenville Spinners in the Class-B South Atlantic League, where he was also the team's starting catcher.

He died July 11, 1953 in Brooklyn, New York City. He is interred at Woodlawn Cemetery in the Bronx, New York City.

Notes

References 

1892 births
1953 deaths
Major League Baseball catchers
New York Giants (NL) players
Philadelphia Phillies players
Baseball players from New York (state)
Minor league baseball managers
Albany Senators players
Pittsfield Electrics players
Waterbury Contenders players
Louisville Colonels (minor league) players
Rochester Hustlers players
New London Planters players
Jersey City Skeeters players
Pittsfield Hillies players
Columbia Comers players
Greenville Spinners players
Charlotte Hornets (baseball) players
Galveston Sand Crabs players
Portland Beavers players
Burials at Woodlawn Cemetery (Bronx, New York)